Éder Luiz Lima de Souza (born January 9, 1987), sometimes known as just Éder, is a Brazilian footballer who plays as a forward for Tianjin Jinmen Tiger.

Club career
Éder Lima would start his career for his local football club Guarani where he stayed for two seasons before joining lower league side Tombense. He would be immediately loaned to top-tier club Flamengo before going to Paraná and then Vila Nova.

Éder Lima moved to top tier Greek side Asteras Tripolis for the 2009–10 Super League Greece season on loan.

On 15 June 2010 Éder Lima was loaned on AEK Athens. He signed a 1+1 year deal.

Eder Lima made his debut in the UEFA Europa League play-offs in a 1–0 win against Dundee United on 19 August 2010. He scored his first goal in a 3–1 home league win against Ergotelis.

On 9 July 2011, he returned to Brazil and was loaned to Campeonato Série B side Criciúma along with Adeílson and Dorival.

In July 2014 he signed with Jeonbuk Hyundai, but registration was not rejected as documents proving Palestinian nationality were not submitted to the Korea Professional Football Federation by the deadline for the transfer period.

Career statistics 
Statistics accurate as of match played 31 December 2021.

Honours

Club
Flamengo
Taça Guanabara: 2008
Rio State League: 2008

References

External links
Soccerway profile

Living people
1987 births
Brazilian footballers
Brazilian expatriate footballers
Association football forwards
CR Flamengo footballers
Guarani FC players
Vila Nova Futebol Clube players
Paraná Clube players
Asteras Tripolis F.C. players
AEK Athens F.C. players
Daegu FC players
Jeonbuk Hyundai Motors players
Seongnam FC players
Criciúma Esporte Clube players
Jiangxi Beidamen F.C. players
China League One players
Super League Greece players
K League 2 players
K League 1 players
Expatriate footballers in Greece
Expatriate footballers in South Korea
Expatriate footballers in China
Brazilian expatriate sportspeople in Greece
Brazilian expatriate sportspeople in South Korea
Brazilian expatriate sportspeople in China
Sportspeople from Campinas